Mateusz Kowalczyk and Szymon Walków were the defending champions but only Walków chose to defend his title, partnering Karol Drzewiecki. Walków lost in the first round to Javier Barranco Cosano and Raúl Brancaccio.

Andrea Vavassori and David Vega Hernández won the title after defeating Pedro Martínez and Mark Vervoort 6–4, 6–7(4–7), [10–6] in the final.

Seeds

Draw

References

External links
 Main draw

Poznań Open - Doubles
2019 Doubles